Arthur Fenton (27 February 1870 – 20 May 1950) was an Australian cricketer. He played one first-class cricket match for Victoria in 1896, and after moving to New Zealand in 1903 he played for Hawke's Bay and Wellington.

An off-spin bowler, useful tail-end batsman and brilliant fielder, Fenton played club cricket in Melbourne and Sydney before being engaged as a professional coach by the Hawke's Bay Cricket Association in late 1903. His best bowling performances were 5 for 78 for Hawke's Bay against Auckland in 1904-05 and 6 for 41 and 3 for 91 against Otago in 1908-09. As well as coaching, he was the caretaker at the Napier Recreation Ground.

He left Hawke's Bay in late 1911 to take up a groundsman's position at Athletic Park rugby ground in Wellington. He carried out drainage works that made a great improvement to the condition of the ground in wet weather. Playing for the University club in Wellington senior cricket, he took three hat-tricks during the 1916-17 season, and finished with 44 wickets at an average of 11.22.

He returned to Australia in 1920. He died in 1950 in Melbourne, where he lived in Power Street, Hawthorn, with his wife Charlotte.

See also
 List of Victoria first-class cricketers

References

External links
 

1870 births
1950 deaths
Australian cricketers
Hawke's Bay cricketers
Victoria cricketers
Wellington cricketers